John Croyston (7 March 1933 - 23 May 2007) was an Australian writer, radio producer and director.

He studied at the University of Sydney and worked as a teacher before going on to work at the ABC. He was a radio producer at the ABC from 1958 to 1964. He then moved into television.

Select Credits
The Quiet Season (1965) - producer
The Runaway (1966) - writer
The Man Who Saw It (1966)
The Schoolmistress (1967) - writer
A Touch of Gold (1967) - writer
Love and War (1967) - producer - also wrote the play "Construction"
The Cell (1968)
Volpone (1968) - director
The Queen's Bishop (1968) - director
Contrabandits (1968) - director
Australian Plays (1969) - producer, also wrote the episode  "A Voyage Out"
A Voyage Out (1969) - writer
Tilley Landed on Our Shores (1969) - director
Chimes at Midnight (1970) - writer
Lane End(1972) -director
Over There (1972) - director
Certain Women (1973) - director
Spoiled (1974) - director
I'm Here, Darlings! (1975) - writer
Behind the Legend (1975) - director
The Seven Ages of Man (1975) - director
Moynihan (1976) - producer
Ride on Stranger (1979) - script editor
Menotti (1980–81) - producer
A Step in the Right Direction (1981) - producer
Studio 86 (1986) - producer

References

External links

Record of his papers at UNSW

1933 births
2007 deaths
Australian television directors
Australian television producers
Australian film directors